Pedetontinus is a genus of jumping bristletails in the family Machilidae. There are at least three described species in Pedetontinus.

Species
These three species belong to the genus Pedetontinus:
 Pedetontinus luanchuanensis
 Pedetontinus tianmuensis
 Pedetontinus yinae

References

Further reading

 
 
 
 
 

Archaeognatha
Articles created by Qbugbot